Goodwood is a residential locality in the local government area (LGA) of Glenorchy in the Hobart LGA region of Tasmania. The 2016 census recorded a population of 1049 for the state suburb of Goodwood.
It is a suburb of Hobart.

The small residential suburb starts just south-east of the Brooker Highway and Goodwood Road junction.  It is best known for its annual Christmas light decorations.  Most houses in Goodwood were built in the 1950s as public housing.  The suburb is also home to light industry and docks.  An Anglican church and two primary schools are also located in the suburb.

History 
Goodwood was gazetted as a locality in 1961.

Geography
The waters of Prince of Wales Bay form the eastern boundary and part of the southern.

Road infrastructure 
National Route 1 (Brooker Highway) passes to the south-west, and several roads provide access to the locality.

References

Towns in Tasmania
Localities of City of Glenorchy